"Lost in the Citadel" is a song by American rapper and singer Lil Nas X. In limited release, it was sent to Italian contemporary hit radio through Sony Music on April 8, 2022, as the fifth and final single from his debut studio album, Montero (2021). The song was written by him and the track's producer John Cunningham.

Composition and lyrics
"Lost in the Citadel" is an 1980s rock-inspired pop rock and pop-punk song that sees Lil Nas X reminiscing about a previous relationship that did not go so well that he cannot stop indulging in, which is in the middle of the complete pop songs and the guitar-heavy second half of the song. The song opens up with a synth melody that is identical to 2000s-inspired bedroom synth-pop, with Lil Nas X singing about his future lover on the "soaring chorus" before the song calms down. It has been described as "a troubled love song", with Lil Nas X belting out: "I need time to get up and get off the floor / I need time to realize that I can't be yours".

Critical reception
Laviea Thomas of Clash deemed the "dystopian daydream" as "a trance-like break from the high energy run-ups", explaining that "it's the perfect break and further edges forward the otherworldly theme that is weaved throughout the entire album". Exclaim! music critic Jordan Currie felt that the song is "a unique standout on the tracklist" of Montero that showcases Lil Nas X's versatility. PJ Somervelle of The Line of Best Fit was reminded of Machine Gun Kelly and Willow from the muted chord riffs of "Lost in the Citadel" and was reminded of Travis Barker from the drums of the song.

Charts

Release history

References

2022 songs
2022 singles
Lil Nas X songs
Songs written by Lil Nas X
Sony Music singles